Grange Furniture is a furniture shop in Monts du Lyonnais, France that was established by Joseph Grange in 1904.  The company continues to produce heirlooms using "old-world techniques" such as dove-tail jointing, hand applied wood stain and lacquer.  Designs are "subtle updates" based on the "feminine shapes" used in 17th century chateaux furniture by André-Charles Boulle and Jean-François Oeben, or other furniture from historic Provence, France homes.  A five-foot cherrywood corner cabinet cost about $6,000 in 2009.

See also
Gothic architecture

References

External links
Grange website 

Furniture